CPAT could be an initialism for:

 Candidate Physical Ability Test
 Clwyd-Powys Archaeological Trust
 Customs-Trade Partnership Against Terrorism